Landhallow  is a small village,  approximately 1 mile west of Latheron in eastern Caithness, Scottish Highlands and is in the Scottish council area of Highland.

References

Populated places in Caithness